The orbiculate cardinalfish, chubby cardinal, or polka-dot cardinalfish (Sphaeramia orbicularis) is a species of Apogonidae (cardinalfishes). It grows to about 10 cm total length, and has a thin, dark vertical 'waistband' with scattered dark spots toward the tail. It is found in coastal areas throughout much of the Indo-Pacific, including off East Africa, Kiribati, the Ryukyu Islands, New Caledonia, Belau, and the eastern Caroline and Mariana Islands.

The male incubates the eggs until they hatch.  It eats mostly planktonic crustaceans, mainly at night. It is not a common marine aquarium fish.

References

External links
 

orbicularis
Fish of Southeast Asia
Fish described in 1828
Taxa named by Georges Cuvier